Lakeshore Learning Materials is a chain of educational supply stores. The company is one of the largest retail and online suppliers of educational materials to teachers with more than 60 stores in 29 states. The company is based in Carson, California and employs more than 2000 people.

Lakeshore Learning Materials was founded in 1954 by Ethelyn Kaplan. She opened a toy store on Lakeshore Avenue in Oakland, California, which inspired the name of the company. The store was modestly successful but after Kaplan noticed that one teacher purchased five puzzles she decided to sell the store and start a new company in San Leandro, California that focused solely on educational products. Her sons Charles and Michael joined the company in 1967 and 1971 and Ethelyn retired four years later. Her grandson Bo Kaplan became CEO in 2009.

"Our niche is institutions", former CEO Charlie Kaplan told the Los Angeles Times in 1995. "When we get parents, we're delighted, but we are set up for schools". Around 70% of the company's products are private label and developed in-house. In 1994, the company partnered with public television station KCET to open the Store of Knowledge, a retail shop selling educational toys and products at the Glendale Galleria.

References

American companies established in 1954
Retail companies established in 1954
Toy retailers of the United States
Education companies established in 1954